Cyrtinus pygmaeus is a species of beetle in the family Cerambycidae. It was described by Haldeman in 1847. It is known from the United States.

References

Cyrtinini
Beetles described in 1847